Pontypridd High School (formerly known as Coedylan Comprehensive) is an English-medium comprehensive school in the village of Cilfynydd near Pontypridd, in the county borough of Rhondda Cynon Taf, Wales.

Admissions
It is for ages 11–18. It is on the west side of the A470.

History

Grammar school
It was known as Pontypridd County Grammar School, a boys' grammar school, which had been established in 1895.

Comprehensive
When becoming comprehensive, it was known as Coedylan Comprehensive School.

Notable former pupils

Pontypridd County Grammar School
 Desmond Brayley, Baron Brayley
 Sir Ivor Broom, station commander of RAF Brüggen from 1962–64, AOC of No. 11 Group RAF from 1970–72, and controller from 1974-77 of National Air Traffic Services (NATS)
 Anthony Crockett, Bishop of Bangor from 2004–08
 Glyn Davies, rugby player
 Sir Trevor Evans, journalist
 Bernard Hedges, professional cricketer with Glamorgan CCC, 1950-1967
 John Hopkins, fellow of Downing College Cambridge, 1961-2004, and university lecturer in law; afterwards emeritus fellow
 Maldwyn James, rugby player
 Brynmor John, Labour MP from 1970-88 for Pontypridd
 David Lloyd Jones, Lord Lloyd-Jones, judge of the High Court (QBD) (2005–12), Lord Justice of Appeal (2012-2017), and first justice of the Supreme Court of the United Kingdom to come from Wales (2017-2022) and (2022- ).
 Geraint Stanley Jones, broadcaster, chief executive from 1989-94 of S4C, Controller from 1981-85 of BBC Wales
 David Kelly, biological weapons expert
 Gareth Owen, vice-chancellor from 1985-87 of the University of Wales, and principal from 1979-89 of University College of Wales, Aberystwyth
 Gareth Payne, rugby player
 Alun Richards, author
 Tudor Rickards
 Sir Tasker Watkins, former High Court judge (1971-1980), Lord Justice of Appeal (1980-1993) and deputy Lord Chief Justice (1988-1993). President of the Welsh Rugby Union, 1993-2004
 Alun Williams, radio presenter
 Gareth Wood, composer

Coedylan Comprehensive School And Pontypridd High School
 Kevin Courtney, former physics teacher, and General Secretary from 2016-2017 of the NUT
 Ash Morgan, singer
 Kimberley Nixon, actress
 Ceri Sweeney, Welsh rugby union international (1991-1998) 
 Martyn Williams, Welsh rugby union international (1987-1994)
 Cory Hill, Welsh rugby union international and British and Irish Lions, 2016–present
 Jarrod Evans, Wales rugby union international, 2019–Present

References

External links
 Pontypridd High School

Secondary schools in Rhondda Cynon Taf
Pontypridd